Barrhead is a town in East Renfrewshire, Scotland, UK

Barrhead may also refer to:

Canada
Barrhead, Alberta, a town
County of Barrhead No. 11, a municipal district in Alberta
Barrhead Airport, County of Barrhead, Alberta
Barrhead (electoral district), Alberta; a provincial electoral district

United Kingdom
Barrhead railway station, Barrhead, Scotland
Barrhead Branch, a branch line of the Glasgow and South Western Railway in Scotland
Barrhead High School, East Renfrewshire, Scotland

See also

Barrhead railway station (disambiguation)
Paisley and Barrhead District Railway, Scotland, UK
Glasgow, Barrhead and Kilmarnock Joint Railway, Scotland, UK
Barrhead-Westlock, Alberta, Canada; a provincial electoral district
Athabasca-Barrhead-Westlock, Alberta, Canada; a provincial electoral district
Barrhead-Morinville-Westlock, Alberta, Canada; a provincial electoral district
Barrhead, Liboside & Uplawmoor (ward), East Renfrewshire, Scotland, UK; a municipal ward
 
Barhead (disambiguation)
 Head (disambiguation)
 Barr (disambiguation)
 Bar (disambiguation)